Doin' Time on Planet Earth is a 1988 American comedy film directed by Charles Matthau and written by Darren Star. The film stars Nicholas Strouse, Andrea Thompson, Martha Scott, Adam West, Hugh Gillin, and Matt Adler. The film was released on September 16, 1988, by Cannon Film Distributors.

Plot
Ryan Richmond lives with his family in a Holiday Inn hotel they own in Arizona. Feeling stuck in this remote part of the US, Ryan wants to leave the US.  Before he can leave, he must find a date for his brother's wedding, and decides to visit a computer dating service.  That is when things go awry.

Cast
 Nicholas Strouse as Ryan Richmond
 Andrea Thompson as Lisa Winston
 Martha Scott as Virginia Camalier
 Adam West as Charles Pinsky
 Hugh Gillin as Fred Richmond
 Matt Adler as Dan Forrester
 Timothy Patrick Murphy as Jeff Richmond
 Candice Azzara as Edna Pinsky
 Gloria Henry as Mary Richmond
 Paula Irvine as Marilyn Richmond
 Hugh O'Brian as Richard Camalier
 Roddy McDowall as Minister
 Maureen Stapleton as Helium Balloon Saleslady
 Dominick Brascia as The Jock
 Kellie Martin as Sheila
 Kelly Mohre Hyman as Donna

References

External links
 

1988 films
1988 comedy films
American comedy films
Golan-Globus films
Films produced by Menahem Golan
Films set in Arizona
Films set in hotels
Films produced by Yoram Globus
1980s English-language films
Films directed by Charles Matthau
1980s American films